Undisonus is an album of contemporary classical music by guitarist Terje Rypdal recorded in 1986 and 1987 and released on the ECM label in 1990.

Reception
The Allmusic review by Paul Collins awarded the album 4 stars stating "Those accustomed to Rypdal's jazz and jazz-rock albums may be startled when they discover his extensive work in orchestral composition, although in some ways Rypdal seems to take these pieces closest to heart".

Track listing
All compositions by Terje Rypdal
 "Undisonus Op. 23 for Violin and Orchestra" - 21:40 
 "Ineo Op. 29 for Choir and Chamber Orchestra" - 18:27 
Recorded at St. Peter's Church in Morden, London in September 1986 (track 1) and at Rainbow Studio in Oslo, Norway in November 1987 (track 2).

Personnel
Terje Tønnesen — violin (track 1) 
Royal Philharmonic Orchestra — conducted by Christian Eggen (track 1)
Grex Vocalis — vocals (track 2)
The Rainbow Orchestra — conducted by Christian Eggen (track 2)

References

ECM Records albums
Terje Rypdal albums
1990 albums
Albums produced by Manfred Eicher